The Western Weekender is a newspaper servicing the region of Penrith, New South Wales. 

The Western Weekender is an independent publication, owned by Western Sydney Publishing Group.

The Western Weekender was first published in 1991. Its first issue was released on March 15, 1991.

It releases issues on Fridays, through editions that are usually out on Thursday, and also runs a digital news service via its website and social media 24 hours a day, seven days a week.

Format
The Western Weekender is produced in tabloid format, and generally has a pagination between 64 and 88 pages each Friday.

It features the following sections: Local News, Business, Entertainment, Weekender Living, Business Directory, Automotive and Sport, as well as special features.

During the rugby league season, The Western Weekender runs a weekly 16-page liftout called 'Extra Time' primarily focused on the Penrith Panthers NRL team.

Each week, a gloss A4 property magazine, 'Western Property', is delivered together with the newspaper.

Discontinued sections include View, FYI, Chill Out and West Life.

Journalists and columnists
The Western Weekender has a team of full-time and part-time journalists, as well as columnists.

The current news team includes: Troy Dodds (Managing Editor), Emily Feszczuk (Police, State Politics and Federal Politics), Cassidy Pearce (Community) and Nathan Taylor (Sport and TV).

The newspaper runs between 10 and 15 columns across a range of subjects each week. High-profile columnists have in the past included Erin Molan, Peter Overton, Ray Hadley, Tony Abbott, Julia Gillard and Luke Priddis.

The Weekender's news team is based out of its Penrith office.

Rugby league
The Western Weekender has a strong connection to rugby league. It is a major sponsor of the Penrith Panthers NRL team, and previously had naming rights of the St Marys Leagues Club Stadium. It runs the biggest rugby league coverage in the Penrith area through its Extra Time publication, delivered weekly. The newspaper has not avoided controversy surrounding its rugby league coverage, however, and in the book 'Panthers, Passion & Politics', there is numerous references to the way the newspaper covered an inquiry into the club.

2008 collapse and 2009 revival
The Western Weekender newspaper collapsed in 2008. It was widely reported that the collapse of the Sydney Spirit National Basketball Team was the cause of the newspaper's demise. Both were owned by the same company. The paper fell into receivership and published for what appeared to be the final time in January 2009. Two months later, The Western Weekender was revived under new ownership - Media View Pty Ltd. Troy Dodds was appointed as its new Editor, the first in a raft of changes to the publication.

During The Western Weekender's hiatus, a new publication titled The Weekly View launched, featuring many of The Western Weekender's staff and much of its content base. It was discontinued upon The Western Weekender's revival in March 2009.

The Western Weekender was purchased by Western Sydney Publishing Group in October 2015.

Expansion
At different times, The Western Weekender has published various sister publications, including the Inner City Weekender, Blue Mountains Record and Newcastle Post.

It has also expanded into digital offerings, with a full service news website and a strong social media presence.

In November 2020, a new sister publication, Parra News, was launched. The newspaper covers the Parramatta and Cumberland regions.

Awards
The Western Weekender received the Highly Commended Award in the Community Newspaper of the Year Awards at the 2014 PANPA Newspaper of the Year Awards

The Western Weekender was honoured for its netball coverage at the 2017 and 2021 Netball NSW Awards

References

Newspapers published in New South Wales
Publications established in 1991
Weekly newspapers published in Australia
1991 establishments in Australia